The 2016–17 Magyar Kupa (English: Hungarian Cup) was the 77th season of Hungary's annual knock-out cup football competition. The 2017 Magyar Kupa Final was won by Ferencvárosi TC on penalties against Vasas SC on 31 May 2017.

Results

Round of 128

|-
| colspan="3" align="center" style="background:#fcc;"|14 September 2016

|-
| colspan="3" align="center" style="background:#fcc;"|21 September 2016

|}

Round of 64

|-
| colspan="3" align="center" style="background:#fcc;"|25 October 2016

|-
| colspan="3" align="center" style="background:#fcc;"|26 October 2016

|}

Round of 32
The third round of the 2016–17 Magyar Kupa was held on 29 and 30 November 2016.

Round of 16
The 8th finals were competed between 11 February 2017 and 1 March 2017.

1st leg

2nd leg

Quarter finals

1st leg

2nd leg

Semi-finals
The draw of the semi-finals was held on 7 April 2017.

1st leg

2nd leg

Final

See also
 2017 Magyar Kupa Final
 2016–17 Nemzeti Bajnokság I
 2016–17 Nemzeti Bajnokság II
 2016–17 Nemzeti Bajnokság III

References

External links
 Official site 

 soccerway.com

Cup
Hungary
Magyar Kupa seasons